Parapristella is a genus of characins found in northern South America.  Currently, two species are described in this genus:
 Parapristella aubynei (C. H. Eigenmann, 1909)
 Parapristella georgiae Géry, 1964

References
 

Characidae
Taxa named by Jacques Géry
Fish of South America